Pavlo Lobtsov (born 9 January 1988) is a Ukrainian professional football player.

References

External links
 
 

1988 births
Living people
Ukrainian footballers
Association football midfielders
Ukrainian expatriate footballers
Expatriate footballers in Belarus
Ukrainian expatriate sportspeople in Belarus
FC Kharkiv players
FC Gomel players
FC Skala Stryi (2004) players
FC Yednist Plysky players
FC Poltava players
FC Arsenal-Kyivshchyna Bila Tserkva players
Footballers from Kharkiv